Peter David Penry Jones (20 May 1938 – 11 March 2009) was a Welsh actor, born in Cardiff.

Career
Jones's television credits include: Colditz, The Professionals, To the Manor Born “Connections in High Places”, Bergerac, Howards' Way, Kavanagh QC and Midsomer Murders “The Electric Vendetta” He also worked with Laurence Olivier at the National Theatre.

Personal life
The son of the Rev. David Penry Jones, a Presbyterian minister in South Wales, in September 1967 in Westminster Jones married the actress Angela Thorne, and they had two sons, actors Laurence and Rupert.

Jones died of bowel cancer in 2009.

Filmography and television

 1969 - Dance of Death - Lieutenant - Film
 1972 - Love Story - Martin - TV Series, Episode: Third Party
 1972-1973 - Colditz - P.O. Peter Muir - TV Series (10 episodes)
 1973 - Hunter's Walk - Doctor - TV Series, Episode: Disturbance
 1973 - Nobody is Norman Wisdom - Morse - TV Series
 1974 - General Hospital - Tony Wainwright - TV Series
 1974 - Happy Ever After - Under Manager - TV Series, Episode: The Hotel
 1974 - Father Brown - John Godfrey - TV Series, Episode: The Curse of the Golden Cross
 1974 - Jennie: Lady Randolph Churchill - Francis Nollis - TV Mini-Series, Episode: Jennie Jerome
 1975 - Edward the 7th - Augustus Paget - TV Mini Series, Episode: Alix
 1976 - Victorian Scandals - Lord Hubert de Burgh - TV Series, Episode: Skittles
 1977 - The Professionals - Cummings - TV Series, Episode: Private Madness, Public Danger
 1979 - Dick Barton: Special Agent - Scientist - TV Series 
 1981 - To the Manor Born - Gayforth - TV Series, Episodes: Back to the Manor, Connections in High Places
 1982 - Solo - Mr. Baines - TV Series
 1983 - Live from Pebble Mill - Father - TV Series, Episode: Night Kids
 1984 - Bergerac - Doctor - TV Series, Episode: A Cry in the Night
 1986 - Screen Two - Anthony Evans - TV Series, Episode: The Silent Twins
 1986 - Dramarama - Bray - TV Series,Episode: Just a Game
 1987 - Born of Fire - The Manager
 1986-1987 - Strike it Rich! - Mark Ashe/Dr. Hewlett - TV Series 
 1987 - Superman IV:The Quest for Peace - Episode: Tourist at Great Wall of China #2
 1985-1987 - Howard's Way - Colin Linsdale - TV Series, 10 episodes
 1988 - Double First - Peter - TV Series, 2 episodes
 1988-1990 - The Ruth Rendell Mysteries - Solicitor/Mr. Browning - TV Series
 1991 - Van der Valk - Markheim - TV Series, Episode: A Sudden Silence
 1992 - Agatha Christie's Poirot - Superintendent Carter - TV Series, Episode: The ABC Murders
 1992 - The Good Guys - Oliver Thornton - TV Series, Episode: Verschwinden
 1993 - Genghis Cohn
 1995 - Bliss - Jeffrey Snowden - TV Movie
 1996 - The Legacy of Reginald Perrin - Tim Ripley - TV Series
 1996 - The Fragile Heart - Surgeon - TV Series, 3 episodes
 2000 - Longitude - Surgeon - TV Movie
 2001 - Kavanagh QC - Andrew Cardigan QC - TV Series, Episodes: The End of Law
 2001 - Midsomer Murders - Peter, Marquis of Ross, TV Series, Episode: The Electric Vendetta
 2001 - Swallow - Sir Terence - TV Series
 2002 - A Prescription for Murder - Dr. John Rutherford - TV Movie
 2004 - The Brief - Patrick Richards QC - TV Series, Episode: The Road to Hell
 2004 - Julian Fellows Investigates: A Most Mysterious Murder - Sir William Gull - TV Series, Episode: The Case of Charles Bravo 
 2005 - Ian Fleming: Bondmaker - Admiral Godfrey - TV Movie 
 2006 - Bombshell - General Kilshaw - TV Series

Notes

External links
 

1938 births
2009 deaths
Male actors from Cardiff
Welsh male stage actors
Welsh male television actors
20th-century Welsh male actors